Archaeohyrax is a genus of extinct notoungulate mammal known from the Middle Eocene to Oligocene of Argentina and Bolivia.

Description 
The holotype of the type species, A. patagonicus, is a skull with a tall, blunt muzzle, and high-crowned cheek teeth. Fossils of Archaeohyrax have been found in the Sarmiento, Agua de la Piedra, and Deseado Formations of Argentina and the Salla Formation of the Salla-Luribay Basin of Bolivia.

References 

Typotheres
Eocene genus first appearances
Oligocene extinctions
Eocene mammals of South America
Oligocene mammals of South America
Deseadan
Tinguirirican
Divisaderan
Mustersan
Paleogene Argentina
Fossils of Argentina
Paleogene Bolivia
Fossils of Bolivia
Fossil taxa described in 1897
Taxa named by Florentino Ameghino
Prehistoric placental genera
Sarmiento Formation